is a Japanese bobsledder. He competed at the 1988, 1992, 1994 and the 1998 Winter Olympics.

References

1965 births
Living people
Japanese male bobsledders
Olympic bobsledders of Japan
Bobsledders at the 1988 Winter Olympics
Bobsledders at the 1992 Winter Olympics
Bobsledders at the 1994 Winter Olympics
Bobsledders at the 1998 Winter Olympics
Sportspeople from Wakayama Prefecture